Mysteria may refer to:

 Mysteria: The Club Experience, a radio station
 Mysteria (city), a temporary city formed during Transformus, an annual arts festival in the Blue Ridge Mountains
 Mysteria (musical group), a musical group by Mark Adam Allison (Phobos), David Evey and Brian Wayy
 "Mysteria" (E Nomine song), a 2003 electronic song
 "Mysteria" (Edguy song), a 2004 heavy metal song
 Mysteria, the first zone of the 2009 video game Henry Hatsworth in the Puzzling Adventure
 "Mysteria" (The Rasmus song), a 2012 pop rock song
 Mysteria (film), a 2011 American thriller film

See also
 Mysterians (disambiguation)
 Mysterio (disambiguation)
 Mysterium (disambiguation)